Ebner-Free House was a historic home located at Vincennes, Knox County, Indiana.  It was built in 1887, and was a -story, frame dwelling with Eastlake movement ornamentation. It has been demolished.

It was added to the National Register of Historic Places in 1985 and delisted in 1999.

References

Former National Register of Historic Places in Indiana
Vincennes, Indiana
Houses on the National Register of Historic Places in Indiana
Houses completed in 1887
Buildings and structures in Knox County, Indiana
National Register of Historic Places in Knox County, Indiana